John R. Dethmers (October 15, 1903 – November 1, 1971) was a politician from the U.S. state of Michigan.

Dethmers was born in Plessis in O'Brien County, Iowa.  He resided in Orange City, Iowa, Holland, Michigan, and East Lansing, Michigan.  He enrolled at Hope College in Holland, Michigan, then went on to the University of Michigan Law School and began to practice law in 1927. Dethmers was a member of various judicial associations and was a family man with three children.  He was Ottawa County Prosecuting Attorney from 1931 to 1938.  He was a member of the Michigan Republican State Central Committee in 1939.  Dethmers served as Chairman of the Michigan Republican Party from 1942 to 1945 and was a delegate to the 1944  Republican National Convention.  He served as Michigan Attorney General from 1945 to 1946.  Governor Harry Kelly appointed Dethmers Justice of the Michigan Supreme Court, serving from 1946 to 1970 and serving as Chief Justice of the Michigan State Supreme Court in 1953, 1956–1962, and 1967–1969.  He was defeated in 1970.  He was a Presbyterian and a member of the American Judicature Society.  John R. Dethmers died in Lansing.

References 

 

1903 births
1971 deaths
Chief Justices of the Michigan Supreme Court
Hope College alumni
University of Michigan Law School alumni
Michigan Attorneys General
Michigan Republican Party chairs
Michigan Republicans
20th-century American lawyers
20th-century American judges
Justices of the Michigan Supreme Court